Dad is a 1989 American comedy-drama film written and directed by Gary David Goldberg and starring Jack Lemmon, Ted Danson, Olympia Dukakis, Kathy Baker, Kevin Spacey and Ethan Hawke. It is based on William Wharton's novel of the same name. The original music score was composed by James Horner. The film was produced by Amblin Entertainment and distributed by Universal Pictures.

Plot
John Tremont is a busy executive. He learns during a meeting that his mother Bette has suffered a heart attack and been rushed to the hospital. Flying immediately to Los Angeles, he ends up becoming a caretaker of his father Jake while Bette is recovering. A retired aerospace industry worker, Jake has become somewhat feeble and totally reliant on his wife, so John attempts to get him more involved in day-to-day things like taking care of the house.

Father and son bond. John invites his dad to a business meeting and takes him out for a Bingo game. They play catch with a baseball in the yard. Late one night, college-aged grandson Billy turns up as well. John begins to appreciate while spending quality time with his dad that he has been neglecting his own son.

Bette returns home from the hospital. She is a strong, willful woman with little personal warmth. Jake is happy to have everyone around him again during family dinners with the kids, including daughter Annie and son-in-law Mario, but the glum Bette resents the intrusion. One day, Jake discovers blood in his urine and is taken to a doctor. John has a single request at the hospital — to avoid the word "cancer," which terrifies his dad. An arrogant doctor named Santana who feels he knows what is best decides that a patient has a right to know tells Jake. Jake immediately loses his bearings and ends up in a coma.

A fiercely protective John stays by his father's side constantly and a more sympathetic doctor named Chad volunteers his help. Jake unexpectedly wakes up one day and seems perfectly fine. Upon coming home, Jake acts reborn and reinvigorated. He confuses his wife by dressing in an odd manner, studying new languages, visiting the neighbors and even wanting sex at night. John feels his dad is just trying to enjoy life, something his bitter mother seems incapable of doing. Something more is definitely wrong with Jake, however. He is having delusions about being the head of a different family on a far-away farm.

A psychiatrist concludes that Jake sought joy in a fantasy world while being unable to experience a sufficient amount in his own. Jake has a relapse. In the hospital, he reminisces with his son about things that made him happiest, like work and baseball, before passing away. John, a better man for the experience, returns to his old life.

Cast
Jack Lemmon as Jake Tremont
Lemmon's son Chris played Young Jake in flashbacks
Ted Danson as John Tremont
Justin Peterson as Young John
Olympia Dukakis as Bette Tremont
Gina Raymond as Young Bette
Kathy Baker as Annie Tremont
Sprague Grayden as Young Annie
Kevin Spacey as Mario
Ethan Hawke as Billy Tremont
Zakes Mokae as Dr. Chad
J. T. Walsh as Dr. Santana
Peter Michael Goetz as Dr. Ethridge
Richard McGonagle as Victor Walton

Reception

Critical response
Dad currently holds a 55% rating on website Rotten Tomatoes, based on 11 critics with an weighted average of 5.7/10. Hal Hinson of The Washington Post wrote, "Dad is a melodramatic plumbing of the relationship between two generations of fathers and sons, and it runs through nearly the entire gamut of emotionally loaded issues, from infirmity and senility to reconciliation and death."

Accolades
Jack Lemmon received much critical acclaim for his performance. He was nominated for a Golden Globe Award. The film was nominated in 1990 for the Academy Award for Best Makeup (Ken Diaz, Greg Nelson and Dick Smith), which went to Driving Miss Daisy.

References

External links

1989 films
1989 comedy-drama films
1989 directorial debut films
Amblin Entertainment films
American comedy-drama films
Films about cancer
Films about families
Films about father–son relationships
Films about old age
Films about parenting
Films based on American novels
Films based on works by William Wharton (author)
Films directed by Gary David Goldberg
Films scored by James Horner
Films set in Los Angeles
Films with screenplays by Gary David Goldberg
Universal Pictures films
1980s English-language films
1980s American films
English-language comedy-drama films